Morelloflavone, an isolate of Garcinia dulcis, belongs to the family of biflavonoids and is an inhibitor of HMG-CoA reductase.

References

Flavonoids